Gold chloride can refer to:

 Gold(I) chloride (gold monochloride), AuCl
 Gold(I,III) chloride (gold dichloride, tetragold octachloride), Au4Cl8
 Gold(III) chloride (gold trichloride, digold hexachloride), Au2Cl6
 Chloroauric acid, HAuCl4 (brown gold chloride); or its sodium salt, NaAuCl4 (gold chloride, sodium gold chloride, yellow gold chloride), used as a histological stain